The heat loss due to linear thermal bridging is a physical quantity used when calculating the energy performance of buildings.  It appears in both United Kingdom and Irish methodologies.

Calculation

The calculation of the heat loss due to linear thermal bridging is relatively simple, given by the formula below:

References

Energy economics
Thermodynamic properties